Lars Skalm (born Lorentz Skallman, circa 1430 in Pargas) was a Finnish noble, having been granted hereditary nobility by King Christian I of Denmark in 1461 for helping his army against rebels in Sweden. He served as Mayor of Turku from 1501 to 1502.

Bibliography
Ramsay, Jully:  Frälsesläkter i Finland intill stora ofreden . Helsinki: Förlagsaktiebolaget Söderström & Co, 1909–16.
Elgenstierna, Gustav:  The introductory part of the Swedish adjective . Stockholm: PA Nordstedt & Söner, 1925–34.
Hiekkanen, Markus; Klemelä, Marja; Ahlström-Taavitsainen, Camilla; Rosenlew, Fredrik:  Sauvo Church . Sauvo, 1996.
Hausen, Reinhold:  Finlands medeltidsurkunder I-VIII . Helsinki: National Archives of Finland, 1910–35.

References

15th-century Finnish nobility
15th-century births
16th-century deaths
Year of death unknown
People from Pargas
Politicians from Turku